Richard Henry "Harry" Goodhew AO (born 19 March 1931) is a retired Australian Anglican bishop who served as the Anglican Archbishop of Sydney from 1993 to 2000. Appointed as a compromise between opposing "conservative" and "liberal" factions of the Sydney Diocese, Goodhew attempted to heal rifts within the diocese while maintaining an Evangelical stance in keeping with the general ethos of the diocese.

Goodhew was born in Sydney and educated at the University of Wollongong. He was ordained in 1958 and began his ministry with curacies at St Matthew's Bondi and St Bede's Beverly Hills. Later he held incumbencies at St Paul's Carlingford and St Stephen's, Coorparoo. In 1976 he was appointed a canon of St Michael's Cathedral, Wollongong and in 1979 Archdeacon of Wollongong. He was Bishop of Wollongong from 1982 to 1993. In 1993 he was elected Archbishop of Sydney and the Metropolitan of New South Wales, retiring in 2001. He is married to Pamela Goodhew.

As archbishop, Goodhew promoted the Archbishop's Vision for Growth founded by Donald Robinson, his predecessor. He opened pathways between the Anglican Diocese of Sydney and other churches, promoted communication between Christians and Jews, and supported the Roman Catholic-founded Cursillo movement, which rapidly expanded among more progressive Anglicans within the diocese.

While archbishop, in order to ease the tensions involved in the debate over women's ordination that had occurred under Archbishop Robinson, Goodhew placed a moratorium on discussing the issue for a time, a move strongly criticised by the Movement for the Ordination of Women. Goodhew maintained a private support for the ordination of women and gave his blessing to women who had left the Diocese of Sydney to be ordained elsewhere.

Harry Goodhew and his wife Pam have long served a missionary role in Africa, visiting African countries to teach and to assist in setting up small business enterprises to aid people in need.

References

Further reading

 

1931 births
University of Wollongong alumni
Archdeacons of Wollongong
Anglican archbishops of Sydney
Assistant bishops in the Anglican Diocese of Sydney
20th-century Anglican bishops in Australia
20th-century Anglican archbishops
21st-century Anglican archbishops
Living people
Evangelical Anglican bishops